Jana Nagyová (born 9 January 1959) is a Slovak actress, most noted for her portrayal as Princess Arabela in Czechoslovak television series Arabela.

Selected filmography 
Penelope (1978)
Smrt Stopařek ("Killing Hitchhikers", 1979)
Arabela (television, 1980)

References

External links

1959 births
Living people
Slovak film actresses
Slovak television actresses
Czechoslovak actresses
People from Komárno